De Cecco is an Italian company producing dried pasta, flour and other related food products. It is the third largest manufacturer of pasta in the world.

History
The company was founded in 1886 by the De Cecco brothers in the small town of Fara San Martino in the Abruzzo region of central Italy. Nicola De Cecco originally produced flour at his stone mill before establishing the pasta factory.
 
In 1908, the company adopted a country girl carrying two wheat sheaves as its trademark. After World War II, the factory was rebuilt after being destroyed by German bomb attacks. In 1950, De Cecco completed a new factory in Pescara to meet the increased demand that occurred after the war. In 1980, a new production facility was opened in Fara San Martino, doubling the company's production output. In 1986  the company began to diversify its offerings by establishing its olive oil brand. De Cecco offerings have since expanded to sauces, grains and tomato based products.

As of 2013, De Cecco is the third-largest pasta producer in the world.

In 2016, turnover reached 447.5 million euros, up by 5.7%, with EBITDA increased by 18% to 49 million and gross profit of 19% to 56 million. The shareholders of the parent company are 24, from the third to the fifth De Cecco generation, divided into three family branches. At the April meeting, the go-ahead was given to the plan to land on the stock exchange. A plan that provides for the reorganization of the group with the entry of external managers, in particular a CEO, also in view of an expansion in the USA. As early as 2007, the opening on the stock exchange was considered, an operation then frozen by the economic crisis in 2008. In March 2018, after closing 2017 with 436 million in revenues and an Ebitda of 50 million, the company approved the restyling of the governance. In June 2018, the guide was entrusted for the first time to an external manager, Francesco Fattori (formerly Findus Italia) who remains in office only until 3 May 2019, the date on which the owner removed him from office due to disputes on mandate obligations.

See also

 List of Italian companies

Further reading
 Pasta De Cecco. Una storia di qualità. Cierre Edizioni, 2006. ISBN, 8883143876.

References

External links 
 

Italian pasta companies
Italian brands
Food and drink companies established in 1886
1886 establishments in Italy